Sandra Chambers (born 11 April 1967), also known as Sandy Chambers or simply Sandy, is a British dance music vocalist based in Italy.

Career 
Chambers moved to Italy in 1992 and her voice has been used in many Italian Electronic dance music productions, mainly Eurodance. In the 2000s Chambers has been frequently used by Italian producers Alle and Benny Benassi who she first met when she did the vocals for a track by the Italian dance act J.K., that the Benassis produced. She also toured with Italian singer Giorgia.

As a songwriter, Chambers contributed to the Corona project. Though never officially confirmed nor denied by the production team, rumours circulated that she also gave her vocals to the project's two first albums and it has later been confirmed that she at least sang "Baby Baby". It was already suspected that Giovanna Bersola, who was known for lending her voice to lip-syncing models, sang Corona's debut single, "The Rhythm of the Night", and the seemingly different voice featured on the other tracks on Corona's debut album was assumed to belong to Chambers, who also had released a single on the same record label (DWA). In 2007, Chambers was credited as “original Corona vocalist Sandy Chambers” on the single "Baby Baby" by Sunblock, a cover version on which she appeared as a featured singer.

Discography 

1990s - "Dreamin' Stop" 
1992 - "Send Me An Angel" 
1993 - "Breakdown" 
1994 - "I'm Feeling" with Charles Shaw
1994 - "Everybody's Dancing"
1995 - "Bad Boy" 
1995 - "Dancing with an Angel" 
1995 - "Wanna Be With You" 
1995 - "You Know What I Want" 
1996 - "My Radio" 
1998 - "Don't tell me Lies" 
1999 - "Sing A Song Now Now" 
2000 - "Lovin' it" 
2002 - "I Miss You" 
2003 - "Get Better" 
2003 - "Illusion" 
2004 - Pumphonia 
"Get Better"
"I Feel So Fine"
"Illusion"
"Turn Me Up"

2005 - ...Phobia 
"Castaway"
"Light"
"Movin' Up"
2005 - "Give It Time" 
2007 - "Play My Music" 
2007 - "Get Hot" 
2008 - "Foundation" 
2008 - "Make the World Go Round" 
2008 - "Break the Wall" 
2009 - "get out of my mind" 
2009 - "this is me" 
2009 - "brighter"

References and notes

21st-century Black British women singers
Living people
1967 births
British emigrants to Italy
20th-century Black British women singers